NAPT (pronounced N-A-P-T) is an English electronic dance music production and DJ duo.

Career
Initially consisting of Ashley Pope and Tomek Naden, in 2010, the duo collaborated with English grime rapper Bashy to release "Make My Day" with Louise Marshall providing the vocals on the chorus.

NAPT were signed to A-Trak's Fool's Gold Records, Chris Lake's Rising Music and Sony International. NAPT's releases are supported by international DJ stars including GTA, Laidback Luke, Skrillex, Tiesto, DJ Zinc, Treasure Fingers, Smutlee, Michael Woods, The Aston Shuffle, Nick Thayer, B.Traits, Don Diablo and played across specialist radio shows including Pete Tong, Danny Howard and Annie Mac on BBC Radio 1.

NAPT released The Dockers EP and the Come Like This EP via Skrillex's Owsla sub-label Nest.

Chart positions

References

External links
 A Farewell From inthemix: Thanks For All The Memories

English electronic music duos
Club DJs
Breakbeat music groups
DJ duos
Remixers
English dance music groups
Electronic dance music duos